Jean Bayet (12 November 1892 – 5 December 1969) was a French Latinist. A Professor of Latin Language and Literature at the Sorbonne, he was Director-General of Education in 1944 and Director of the École française de Rome from 1952 to 1960. In 1948 he was elected a member of the Académie des inscriptions et belles-lettres. A specialist of Latin literature and Religion in ancient Rome, Jean Bayet, through his works and the theses he directed, played a decisive role in the development of a French school of history of the Roman religion, particularly active in the second half of the twentieth century.

Biography 
His grandfather was mayor of Commentry Allier from 1871 to 1873.

François Bayet, his son, died in deportation.

As a child he was overwhelmed with an infirmity in his legs, which made walking painful and made him suffer all his life; he had to give up the military career his father had followed.

He entered the École normale supérieure in 1912, obtained his agrégation of letters and was a member of the École française de Rome from 1917 to 1920.

In 1915, he was awarded one of the Montyon Prizes by the Académie française and the Marcelin Guérin Prize in 1933.

He taught first in secondary education (at the Lycée Charlemagne and the Lycée de Laon), while continuing the preparation of his doctoral theses on Les Origines de l'Hercule romain and the critical study of the main monuments related to the Etruscan Hercules, which he defended in 1926. He was then appointed to the Faculty of Arts of Caen, before moving to the Sorbonne in 1932.

He was elected a member of the Académie des Inscriptions et Belles-Lettres 3 December 1948. He was also a member of the Accademia dei Lincei and of the Pontificia Accademia Romana di Archeologia.

Jean Bayet was director of the École française de Rome from 1952 to 1960 (where he succeeded Albert Grenier and was in turn succeeded by Pierre Boyancé). In 1954-1955, he presided the Unione internazionale degli Istituti di archeologia, storia e storia dell'arte in Roma.

Upon his return, he retired (1961). His last years were obscured by the disease which gradually froze him in immobility.

Works (selection) 
1926: Les Origines de l'Hercule romain (« Bibliothèque des Écoles françaises d'Athènes et de Rome », n° 132), Paris, E. de Boccard
1934: Littérature latine. Histoire, pages choisies, Paris, Armand Colin; numerous reprints.
1957: Histoire politique et psychologique de la religion romaine, Paris, Payot; numerous reprints.

Sources 
 Christophe Charle, Les Professeurs de la Faculté des lettres de Paris : dictionnaire biographique, 1909-1939, Paris, Éd. du CNRS, 1986. 
 Georges Rougeron, Les Bourbonnais à l'Institut de France (an IV-1965), Moulins, 1966.
 Michel Lejeune, « Éloge funèbre de M. Jean Bayet, académicien ordinaire », Comptes rendus des séances de l'Académie des inscriptions et belles-lettres, 113e année, n° 4, 1969, . online.
 Pierre Boyancé, "Jean Bayet, directeur de l'École Française de Rome (1952-1960)", Mélanges d'archéologie et d'histoire, 82, 1970. . online.

References

External links 
 Jean Bayet on the site of the Académie française
 Jean Bayet. Histoire politique et psychologique de la religion romaine (compte rendu) on Persée

People from Versailles
1892 births
1969 deaths
École Normale Supérieure alumni
French Latinists
Latin–French translators
Academic staff of the University of Paris
French scholars of Roman history
Members of the Académie des Inscriptions et Belles-Lettres
20th-century translators